Miguel Mojica (born 28 December 1975) is a Dominican Republic boxer. He competed in the men's lightweight event at the 1996 Summer Olympics.

References

1975 births
Living people
Dominican Republic male boxers
Olympic boxers of the Dominican Republic
Boxers at the 1996 Summer Olympics
Place of birth missing (living people)
Lightweight boxers